Michael Melchiondo Jr., better known by his stage name Dean Ween, is an American guitarist, singer and a founding member of the alternative rock group Ween. He is currently active in the groups Ween, Moistboyz and The Dean Ween Group.

Biography
In 1984, Melchiondo met Aaron Freeman in a junior high school typing class, in their hometown of New Hope, Pennsylvania. The two adopted the fictitious surname Ween after the demon-god Boognish appeared to them, with Melchiondo taking up the name Dean Ween and Freeman the name Gene Ween.

In 1991, Melchiondo formed the punk rock duo Moistboyz with Guy Heller. Moistboyz have released five eponymous studio recordings.

Melchiondo made contributions to two projects by his friend Josh Homme: The Desert Sessions and Queens of the Stone Age. On the 2002 Queens of the Stone Age album Songs for the Deaf, Melchiondo played guitar on "Mosquito Song", "Gonna Leave You", and "Six Shooter".

In 2009 Melchiondo received his captain's license and regularly leads fishing trips off the Jersey Shore as Mickey's Guide Service.

 In 2012, in the wake of Ween's breakup, Melchiondo formed The Dean Ween Group. In August 2016 the Dean Ween Group's debut album, The Deaner Album, was announced with the release of the first track entitled "Mercedes Benz". On October 7, 2016 Melchiondo's first-ever solo music video was released for the song "Exercise Man", the music video was directed by Monica Hampton. "The Deaner Album" was subsequently released on October 21, 2016 through ATO Records. Melchiondo's second solo album under The Dean Ween Group moniker, rock2, was released on March 16, 2018.

Discography 
with Ween

 GodWeenSatan: The Oneness (1990)
 The Pod (1991)
 Pure Guava (1992)
 Chocolate and Cheese (1994)
 12 Golden Country Greats (1996)
 The Mollusk (1997)
 White Pepper (2000)
 Quebec (2003)
 Shinola Vol. 1 (2005)
 La Cucaracha (2007)

with Dean Ween Group

 The Deaner Album (2016)

Projects and appearances outside Ween

References

External links

 The Dean Ween Group official website

American alternative rock musicians
American fishers
American people of Italian descent
American rock guitarists
Living people
People from Bucks County, Pennsylvania
Pigface members
Ween members
Alternative rock guitarists
American male guitarists
Year of birth missing (living people)